The following is a list of the episodes of the British television series Casualty that were broadcast in its first 20 series. Casualty premiered on 6 September 1986 and was originally commissioned for fifteen episodes. The first series concluded on 27 December 1986. Following, its success, a second series was commissioned and Casualty has continued running since.

Series overview

Episodes

Series 1 (1986)

Series 2 (1987)

Series 3 (1988)

Series 4 (1989)

Series 5 (1990)

Series 6 (1991–1992)

Series 7 (1992–1993)

Series 8 (1993–1994)

Series 9 (1994–1995)

Series 10 (1995–1996)

Series 11 (1996–1997)

Series 12 (1997–1998)

Series 13 (1998–1999)

Series 14 (1999–2000)

Series 15 (2000–2001)

Series 16 (2001–2002)

Series 17 (2002–2003)

Series 18 (2003–2004)

Series 19 (2004–2005)

Series 20 (2005–2006)

Casualty@Holby City

Of the nine crossover episodes broadcast as Casualty@Holby City, five aired in Casualty's regular timeslot, while the remaining four — "Casualty@Holby City: Part Two", "Test Your Metal", "A Great Leap Forward" and "Deny Thy Father: Part Two" — were broadcast in Holby Citys timeslot.

See also
 Lists of Casualty episodes

Notes

References

Casualty
Casualty (TV series) episodes